This is a list of educational, campaigning and community organizations related to BDSM.

Where an organization clearly indicates on its website that membership is restricted by gender or sexual orientation, this is noted. Many BDSM organizations of the social/community variety will require prospective members to attend an orientation meeting, where among other things, the organizers will attempt to screen out the obviously mentally ill and those whose interest in BDSM is professional (for example as journalists or law enforcement personnel) rather than personal.

Europe

Czech Republic 

 Other World Kingdom

Germany 

 Böse Buben
 Bundesvereinigung Sadomasochismus
 SMJG

United Kingdom 

 Spanner Trust

North America

United States 

 Black Rose, Washington D.C.
 Center for Sex Positive Culture (aka The Wet Spot), Seattle
 Conversio Virium (CV), Columbia University, New York City
 The Eulenspiegel Society, New York City
 Folsom Street Events, San Francisco, California
 Lesbian Sex Mafia, lesbians and bisexual women only, New York City 
 National Coalition for Sexual Freedom
 National Leather Association International
 Samois, lesbians only, San Francisco, California (historical)
 Society of Janus, San Francisco, California

See also
 Glossary of BDSM
 List of BDSM topics
 List of universities with BDSM clubs

External links

BDSM organizations